Farrenc is a surname. Notable people with the surname include:

Aristide Farrenc (1794–1865), French flautist
Louise Farrenc (1804–1875), French composer, pianist, and teacher